Mission to Venice is a 1964 French-Italian-West German film starring Sean Flynn based on a novel by James Hadley Chase and directed by André Versini.

It is also known as Agent Spécial à Venise aka Voir Venise et... Crever.

Plot
A man looking for a missing husband stumbles upon a spy ring.

Cast
Sean Flynn as Michel Nemours
Madeleine Robinson as Marie Trégard
Karin Baal as Maria Natzka
Hannes Messemer as Carl Natzka
Pierre Mondy as Paul Trégard
Daniel Emilfork as Mr. Coliso
Jacques Dufilho as César
Ettore Manni

External links

1964 films
1960s spy thriller films
French spy thriller films
Films based on works by James Hadley Chase
Films based on British novels
Films set in Venice
West German films
1960s French-language films
English-language French films
English-language German films
English-language Italian films
1960s English-language films
1960s multilingual films
French multilingual films
German multilingual films
Italian multilingual films
1960s Italian films
1960s French films